Francis Xavier Brady (March 29, 1857 – March 13, 1911) was an American Catholic priest and Jesuit. Born near Gettysburg, Pennsylvania, he studied at Woodstock College, and held positions in various Jesuit institutions before becoming President of Loyola College in Maryland in 1908. He held the office until his death in 1911.

Early life 
Francis Xavier Brady was born on March 29, 1857, in Buchanan Valley near Gettysburg, Pennsylvania, to Samuel J. Brady and Margaret Goy. His father was of Irish descent, while his mother was Pennsylvania Dutch. One of five children, he had three brothers and a sister who entered the Sisters of St. Joseph. Francis decided to join the Society of Jesus, and entered the novitiate in Frederick, Maryland, on July 21, 1873. As part of his studies, he was sent to Woodstock College in 1876. After three years, he went to teach at Gonzaga College. He was then transferred to St. Peter's Church in Jersey City, New Jersey, in 1881, before returning to Woodstock in 1884 to complete his education.

Because of his poor health, the Jesuit superiors decided to expedite his studies, and he was ordained a priest by Cardinal James Gibbons on August 28, 1886, at Woodstock College.

Pastoral and educational career 
Brady became the vice president of Loyola College in Maryland in 1892, serving in this position for three years. He was then appointed pastor of St. Ignatius Church in Baltimore in 1895; his term as pastor came to an end in 1908, and he was succeeded by John D. Whitney. In June 1908, Brady was named the President of Loyola College. He served in this position until his death on March 13, 1911, in Baltimore.

References

Citations

Sources

External links 

1857 births
1911 deaths
People from Gettysburg, Pennsylvania
19th-century American Jesuits
20th-century American Jesuits
Woodstock College alumni
Presidents of Loyola University Maryland